Ramón Mejía (born 31 August 1943) is a Mexican equestrian. He competed at the 1968 Summer Olympics and the 1972 Summer Olympics.

References

1943 births
Living people
Mexican male equestrians
Olympic equestrians of Mexico
Equestrians at the 1968 Summer Olympics
Equestrians at the 1972 Summer Olympics
Sportspeople from Baja California Sur
People from Mulegé Municipality